Funky Serenity is an album by the pianist Ramsey Lewis, released in 1973 on Columbia Records. The album got to No. 6 on the Billboard Jazz Albums chart.

Samples
"Dreams" was sampled by A Tribe Called Quest on the song "Electric Relaxation", from their 1993 LP Midnight Marauders. Beck also sampled "Dreams" on the song "Debra."

"My Love For You" was also sampled by Musiq Soulchild on the track "Girl Next Door." Additionally, "If Loving You is Wrong, I Don't Want to Be Right" was sampled by The Fugees on "Fu-Gee-La."

Reception

AllMusic called the album "enjoyable and essential".

Track listing
All compositions by Cleveland Eaton, Morris Jennings and Ramsey Lewis except as indicated
 "Kufanya Mapenzi (Making Love)" (Eddie Green) - 5:17  
 "(If Loving You Is Wrong) I Don't Want to Be Right" (Homer Banks, Carl Hampton, Raymond Jackson) - 5:24  
 "What It Is!" - 2:41  
 "My Love for You" (Green) - 5:14  
 "Nights in White Satin" (Justin Hayward) - 5:36  
 "Serene Funk" - 4:11  
 "Dreams" - 9:39  
 "Betcha by Golly, Wow" (Thom Bell, Linda Creed) - 5:09  
 "Where Is the Love" (Ralph MacDonald, William Salter) - 4:56

Personnel 
Ramsey Lewis - piano, electric piano, harpsichord
Cleveland Eaton - bass, electric bass, percussion
Morris Jennings  - drums, congas, percussion
Ed Green - percussion, violin

References 

1973 albums
Ramsey Lewis albums
Columbia Records albums